Hot Streets is the tenth studio album (twelfth overall) by the American band Chicago, released in 1978.   This was the band's first album with all-new material released since their second that did not have a numbered title. It was also the first album not to feature original guitarist/vocalist Terry Kath, who died from an accidental self-inflicted gunshot wound in January 1978. He was replaced by Donnie Dacus on this album.

Background
Having worked with James William Guercio since their 1969 debut, Chicago decided to part ways with the producer following the release of Chicago XI in 1977.  Another major change for the group was the death of guitarist Terry Kath in January 1978, who accidentally shot himself at a roadie's house while playing with a gun. The members of the band were devastated by his death, and considered breaking up. After the initial shock waned, the group decided they still had something to offer musically, and carried on.

Phil Ramone, who had mixed some of their earlier albums, was called upon to co-produce their new effort.  But before Chicago could begin recording, they had to contend with the difficult process of finding a new guitarist.  Accomplished guitarist Donnie Dacus was chosen, bringing his own distinctive style to the group's music.  Prior to joining Chicago, Dacus had worked with both Roger McGuinn and Stephen Stills.

Recording sessions took place both in Miami and Los Angeles that spring, after years of working at Guercio's Caribou Ranch in Colorado.  By the end of the sessions, the band felt as though they were still in a strong musical position even after the loss of Kath.  Some of the tracks featured  the Bee Gees and their keyboardist, Blue Weaver, who were recording the album Spirits Having Flown next door at the same Miami studio.  The Gibb brothers added vocals to the song "Little Miss Lovin'" while Weaver added synthesized strings to "No Tell Lover" and "Show Me The Way".  In turn, Chicago's horn section played on Spirits Having Flown, most notably on the hit single "Too Much Heaven".

To mark their new beginning, the band broke with tradition by giving their album a title, rather than a number.  Having chosen the title Hot Streets, the album cover featured a picture of the band (shot by photographer Norman Seeff) rather than just the group logo. Because a later marketing survey noted that consumers expected to see the logo on the cover, Chicago's logo returned in the form of a high-rise building for the follow-up album, Chicago 13.

The album was released in October 1978, preceded by a release of the lead single "Alive Again".  Hot Streets was another hit for the group, who had been concerned that the public might not accept them without Kath. Although the album went platinum, and Chicago scored a second top-twenty hit with "No Tell Lover", Hot Streets was the first Chicago album since their debut that failed to reach the US Top 10; fittingly, the band's twelfth album peaked at #12.

Although unsuccessful commercially, Cash Box said of the single "Gone Long Gone" that the guitar introduction sounds like George Harrison and said that it has "slick harmonies and smooth production" and praised "Donnie Dacus' guitar shadings."  Record World said it is "a soft, mid-tempo rocker propelled by Peter Cetera's familiar vocals and some compelling lofty guitar work."

Following the release of Chicago 13 and at the end of the Christmas 1979 tour, Dacus would be released from the group, bringing his short tenure with Chicago to an abrupt end.

In 2003, Hot Streets was remastered and reissued by Rhino Records with an alternate version of Lamm's "Love Was New" sung by Dacus as a bonus track.

Track listing

Personnel

Chicago 
 Peter Cetera – bass, lead and backing vocals
 Donnie Dacus – guitars, lead and backing vocals
 Laudir de Oliveira – percussion
 Robert Lamm – keyboards, lead and backing vocals
 Lee Loughnane – trumpet, backing vocals, brass arrangement (8)
 James Pankow – trombone, brass arrangements (1-7, 9-10)
 Walter Parazaider – woodwinds
 Danny Seraphine – drums

Additional personnel 
 Blue Weaver – ARP String Ensemble on "No Tell Lover" and "Show Me The Way"
 David "Hawk" Wolinski – Fender Rhodes on "Show Me The Way"
 Bee Gees – backing vocals on "Little Miss Lovin'"

Production 
 Produced by Phil Ramone and Chicago
 Associate Producer – Carol Peters
 Engineered by Jim Boyer, Don Gehman and Lee DeCarlo.
 Assistant Engineers – Peter Lewis, Dave Martone and Kevin Ryan.
 Mixed by Jim Boyer and Phil Ramone
 Mastered by Ted Jensen at Sterling Sound (New York, NY).
 Photography and Design – Norman Seeff
 Logo – Nick Fasciano

Charts

Singles – Billboard (North America)

References

Chicago (band) albums
1978 albums
Albums produced by Phil Ramone
Columbia Records albums
Albums recorded at Record Plant (Los Angeles)